The Leipziger Volkszeitung or LVZ (German for Leipzig People's Newspaper) is a daily regional newspaper in Leipzig and western Saxony, Germany. First published on 1 October 1894, the LVZ was formerly an important publication of the workers' movement and is currently the only local newspaper in Leipzig.

Existing in other nearby regions in various forms, the LVZ'''s circulation was 211,221 in the fourth quarter of 2011. It is owned by Madsack Group. The LVZ is published six times a week (Monday-Saturday) and is edited by Bernd Hilder.

History and profile
The Leipziger Volkszeitung has a long connection with social democracy. From its first publication on 1 October 1894, with a circulation of 11,000 copies, it was a successor to the former newspaper Wähler (meaning Voter in English). Led by chief editor Bruno Schönlank, in the LVZ's early years it was edited and printed on Mittelstraße in Leipzig. From 1902-1907 Franz Mehring was editor, and from 1908-1913 Paul Lensch; at this time the LVZ (with a circulation of 53,000 in 1914) was the most important mouthpiece for the Social Democrat Party wing of Rosa Luxemburg. In 1917, following the division of the SPD, the newspaper came into the possession of the Independent Social Democratic Party of Germany (USPD). After the party's re-unification in 1922, the LVZ became an SPD mouthpiece once again, until it was banned by the National Socialists in 1933.

Between 1946 and the mid-1950s, a new newspaper-printing house was built on the former site of the Leipziger Neuesten Nachrichten (Leipziger Latest News) which had been destroyed in World War II. This building was used by the LVZ, which functioned as an organ of the Socialist Unity Party from 19 May 1946 in western Saxony, later also north-west Saxony, until German reunification in 1989.

In 1991 the Leipziger Volkszeitung was sold by the East German Treuhand. Half was sold to Axel Springer AG, and half to Madsack (Hanover). During the third quarter of 1992 the circulation of the paper was 340,000 copies.LVZ had a circulation of 305,000 copies in 2001. In October 2008 Springer began talks with Madsack, selling the LVZ as well as other regional titles (Ostsee-Zeitung, Lübecker Nachrichten and Kieler Nachrichten). The Madsack Group has owned 100% of the Leipziger Volkszeitung since 5 February 2009.Madsack: „Axel Springer verkauft Regionalzeitungsbeteiligungen an Verlagsgruppe Madsack“ Retrieved 29 January 2012. The SPD's media group dd_vg owns 20.4% of the Madsack Group.

Region of circulation
The LVZ is sold around Leipzig, in western, northern and central Saxony, and in the northern part of Altenburger Land in Thuringia. In some places outside Leipzig the newspaper's name is changed, as in Döbeln or Altenburg, but in other localities its name remains the Leipziger Volkszeitung with a local subtitle.

Kunstpreis
On the occasion of its hundredth anniversary in 1994, the Leipziger Volkszeitung donated an art prize, which has been awarded every two years since 1995. It comes with prize money of 10,000 euros, an exhibition at the Museum of Fine Arts Leipzig and a catalog.

Other versions
The "LVZ" is sold under a different name in:

In the following regions, it is sold as the Leipziger Volkszeitung'' plus a subtitle:

References

External links
 Leipziger Volkszeitung
 Döbelner Allgemeine
 Oschatzer Allgemeine Zeitung
 Torgauer Zeitung
 Osterländer Volkszeitung
 Dresdner Neuste Nachrichten

1894 establishments in Germany
German-language newspapers
German news websites
Mass media in Leipzig
Daily newspapers published in Germany
Publications established in 1894